Try To Be Hopeful is the second studio album by Scottish band The Spook School. It was released in October 2015 by Fortuna Pop!.

Track listing

References

2015 albums
The Spook School albums